Endless Sleep Chapter 47 is the sixteenth studio album Australian blues rock band, The Black Sorrows. The album was the second of two simultaneously-released limited edition vinyl in Australia in April 2015. It was later released on digital download and compact disc in Europe.

The band supported the European release with a 16-date tour of the UK and Scandinavia in August 2016, including 6 performances at Edinburgh Fringe Festival.

At the ARIA Music Awards of 2015, Endless Sleep was nominated for ARIA Award for Best Blues and Roots Album, losing to Gon' Boogaloo by C. W. Stoneking.

Background
Following on from the success of their album Certified Blue in 2014, The Black Sorrows simultaneously released two limited edition 12" vinyl LPs in time for Record Store Day on 18 April 2015. The LPs are a tribute to the lyricists. Joe Camilleri said; "I tip my hat to the spirit of these artists who have inspired me and give the songs another opportunity to be heard...I’m a disciple and it's a bit of soul food."

The title Endless Sleep refers to the fact that the original artists of the songs are no longer alive. Camelleri said "As the original artists are no longer living, Endless Sleep, Track 1 of Chapter 47, by fifties rockabilly artist Jody Reynolds, seemed the perfect title." The 'Chapter 47' refers to the number of albums lead singer Joe Camilleri has released over his career, dating back to the 1960s and including Jo Jo Zep & The Falcons, The Revelators, his solo works and The Black Sorrows.

Reception

Dylan Stewart from The Music gave the album 3.5 out of 5, saying: "There's a moment on Endless Sleep Chapter 47 during the Black Sorrows' cover of Hank Williams' 'I'm So Lonesome I Could Cry' when it seems as though Williams had written the tune especially for Joe Camilleri, some 66 years after the fact." Stewart added: "Of course, there are plenty more upbeat covers here, and it's this contrast across the record that most appeals. Clearly a passion project, Chapter 47 is a bucket of fun and memories, wrapped in that vintage Black Sorrows sound."

A reviewer from Daily Planet on ABC said the albums (referring to Chapters 46 and 47) are "full of beautifully judged covers of country, blues, soul, rock and jazz recordings that have continued to inspire him."

Track listing
Vinyl (HEAD210V-47)

Band members
Joe Camilleri – vocals, guitar, saxophone, harp 
John McAll – keyboards, vocals 
Claude Carranza – guitar, vocals 
 Mark Gray – bass, vocals
Angus Burchall – drums

Release history

References

The Black Sorrows albums
2015 albums
Albums produced by Joe Camilleri
Covers albums